Georgios Amanatidis (born 4 April 1970) is a Greek former professional footballer who played as a defender.

Playing career
Amanatidis was captain of the Greek side Olympiacos F.C., and a member of the team which reached 7 Greek Championships successively (1997–2003). After 13 years in Olympiacos FC, he joined the roster of his former coach Takis Lemonis at Cypriot club APOEL in which he won the championship also. He also played for Apollon Kalamarias F.C., Kerkyra F.C., Ethnikos Asteras F.C. and Panachaiki FC.

Amanatidis earned 18 caps for the Greece national team.

Personal life 
He is not related to Greek footballer and striker Ioannis Amanatidis.

Honours

Club
Olympiacos
Greek Championship: 1997, 1998, 1999, 2000, 2001, 2002, 2003
Greek Cup: 1999

References

External links 
 
 

1970 births
Living people
Greek footballers
Greece international footballers
Super League Greece players
Cypriot First Division players
Apollon Pontou FC players
Olympiacos F.C. players
A.O. Kerkyra players
Ethnikos Asteras F.C. players
Panachaiki F.C. players
Association football defenders
People from Kastoria (regional unit)
Footballers from Western Macedonia